Leïlah Mahi (September 1890, Beyrouth, Lebanon – 12 August 1932, Paris) was a French writer.

Her first work, En Marge du Bonheur (On the Margins of Happiness), was published in 1929. Her second book, La Prêtresse sans Dieu (The Priestess without God) appeared in 1931, the year before her death. Both titles were published by Louis Querelle (26 Rue Cambon, Paris) as numbered, limited edition print runs.

Personal life 
Leïlah's death certificate records her as unmarried and gives her domicile as 13 rue Shakespeare, Nice, Alpes-Maritimes, but she actually died at 59 Rue Geoffroy Saint Hillaire, Paris. Her memorial can be found in the columbarium of Père Lachaise Cemetery.

Legacy 
French author Didier Blonde's biography of Mahi won the 2015 Prix Renaudot de l'essai.

References

External links 

 

1890 births
Emigrants from the Ottoman Empire to France
1932 deaths
20th-century French novelists
20th-century French women writers
People from Beirut
Burials at Père Lachaise Cemetery